Bradford Ropes (January 1, 1905 – November 21, 1966) was a prolific novelist and screenwriter whose work includes the novel 42nd Street that was adapted for the 1933 film of the same name and then a Tony Award winning musical, also of the same name. His next novel, Stage Mother in 1933 was also adapted to film. He also wrote many Western stories as well as screenplays for Abbott and Costello.

Ropes was born in Boston, Massachusetts. He died in the Wollaston section of Quincy, Massachusetts.

Ropes wrote in 1932 that America was still waiting for the "Uncle Tom's Cabin of the chorus girl."

References

1905 births
1966 deaths
Writers from Boston
20th-century American novelists
American Western (genre) novelists